Belgium competed at the 2016 Winter Youth Olympics in Lillehammer, Norway from 12 to 21 February 2016.

Medalists

Medalists in mixed NOCs events

Alpine skiing

Boys

Girls

Parallel mixed team

Biathlon

Boys

Cross-country skiing

Boys

Freestyle skiing

Ski cross

Ice hockey

Short track speed skating

Boys

Mixed team relay

Qualification Legend: FA=Final A (medal); FB=Final B (non-medal); FC=Final C (non-medal); FD=Final D (non-medal); SA/B=Semifinals A/B; SC/D=Semifinals C/D; ADV=Advanced to Next Round; PEN=Penalized

Snowboarding

Halfpipe

Slopestyle

See also
Belgium at the 2016 Summer Olympics

References

2016 in Belgian sport
Nations at the 2016 Winter Youth Olympics
Belgium at the Youth Olympics